The Lindauer Psychotherapiewochen (LP) are specialist conferences primarily intended as further training for doctors, psychologists, and child and youth psychotherapists, especially in psychodynamic psychotherapy. They have been held annually in April in Lindau since 1950. Since 1967, the conference has been organized by the Vereinigung für psychotherapeutische Fort- und Weiterbildung.

The conferences' scientific directors are Cord Benecke (since 2020), Peter Henningsen (since 2011) and Dorothea Huber (since 2017).

Concept 
Each of the two conference weeks is dedicated to a topic that the Scientific Directorate and the Scientific Advisory Board consider to be relevant or that they feel has been neglected. Lectures, presentations, and seminars are held on these topics. The conferences are held on the island of Lindau, in the border triangle of Germany, Austria, and Switzerland. The conference language is German, with occasional English-language events. About 4,000 medical and psychological psychotherapists and members of related professions attend one of the two weeks.

History 
The first psychotherapy course was led in 1950 by Ernst Speer, who had run one of the first psychotherapeutic clinics in Lindau since 1922.

After the number of participants and staff increased to about 300, the range of topics also increased accordingly. In 1955, Ernst Speer and Ernst Kretschmer agreed that no conference should take place in 1956 in order to give more space to other AÄGP events. Thereafter, after a one-year break in 1957, the Lindau Psychotherapy Weeks were held annually again until today. In 1958 Ernst Speer chaired the Lindau Psychotherapy Week for the last time. Helmuth Stolze now took over the conference management from his uncle Ernst Speer. As early as 1949, Stolze had begun his further psychotherapeutic training at the courses for psychotherapy run by Ernst Kretschmer. With his courageous decision to take responsibility for organisation and design from 1959, Stolze shaped the didactic-scientific concept and a particularly collegial atmosphere open to all psychotherapeutic directions for 20 years as director. A new development began in Lindau to promote self-awareness and practice in new procedures. From 1959, a second week of exercises and seminars became a permanent institution. As  took over the presidency of the General Medical Association for Psychotherapy in 1959 and Stolze the direction of the Lindau Psychotherapy Week, the Lindau Psychotherapy Week was organised in agreement with the AÄGP.

From the 11th Lindau Psychotherapy Week in 1961 onwards, new self-experience groups were offered every year in Lindau, whose members underwent self-experience in analytical group psychotherapy and tested a new possible way of analytically oriented further training with this fractionated work of two to four session periods per year. This work in the analytical self-experience groups subsequently became a building block of psychotherapeutic further training. As early as 1951, W. Schindler had introduced group work as part of the Lindau Psychotherapy Weeks.

The psychiatrist Erich Lindemann emigrated to Harvard in the United States after working for Viktor von Weizsäcker in Heidelberg for a year. Lindemann led a self-awareness group in Lindau from 1960. Ernst Speer died in Lindau on 28 March 1964, Ernst Kretschmer also died in the same year. In 1965, the "Programme Committee" took over the organisation of the leading themes and lectures, which together with Helmuth Stolze (Munich), Hanspeter Harlfinger (Tübingen-Wehen),  (Tübingen-Mainz), Leonhard Schlegel (Zurich), Eckart Wiesenhütter (Würzburg-Tübingen-Bethel), Wulf Wunnenberg (Hamburg), Peter Hahn (Heidelberg) belonged.

In 1967, the "Vereinigung für psychotherapeutische Fort- und Weiterbildung e.V." was founded under the chairmanship of Paul Kluge, which now acts as the legal sponsor of the Lindau Psychotherapy Weeks. The Lindau Psychotherapy Weeks developed in the 1970s from a pure lecture event into a conference offering courses, seminars and exercises on an ever-increasing scale. The programme was structured so that each of the two weeks could be attended independently of the other. In 1974, Helmut Remmler officially took over the management together with Helmuth Stolze, having already been involved in the planning of the programme and in the organisation since 1973, and having previously been involved as a staff member of the Psychotherapy Weeks. In 1978, after 20 years, Helmuth Stolze ended his work in the direction of the Lindau Psychotherapy Weeks and passed it on to his successors Helmut Remmler, Peter Buchheim and Theodor Seifert.

In 1976 and 1983, Paul Watzlawick, an Austrian-born psychoanalyst and sociologist, presented his "Psychotherapeutic Theory of Communication" to conference attendees. From 1984 onwards, each of the two psychotherapy weeks had its own central theme – from then on, both weeks were structured in the same way in terms of content and organisation.

In 1986 Helmut Remmler retired as a member of the scientific management. Peter Buchheim and Theodor Seifert were now the two directors of the Lindau Psychotherapy Weeks. , psychiatrist and psychoanalyst from Ulm, who had already been involved in the programme since 1989, joined the management after being elected by the association's board. The members of the board of the "Association for Psychotherapeutic Continuing Education" are Peter-Christian Fink, Werner Stucke, Barbara Buddeberg-Fischer. Honorary members of the association are Clemens Henrich and Paul Kluge. In 1987 Otto F. Kernberg was in Lindau for the first time. He gave lectures on "Concepts of the psychotherapeutic relationship" and "What works in the psychotherapy of severe personality disorders?"

The relationship between the AÄGP and the LP was shaped by personalities who worked in the executive committees of both organisations for the further development of psychotherapy. Werner Stucke had chaired both the AÄGP and the Vereinigung für Psychotherapeutische Weiterbildung (Association for Psychotherapeutic Continuing Education) for many years and had given prominence to information events on issues of psychotherapeutic continuing education in Lindau.

The psychotherapy researcher and former president of the North American Society for Psychotherapy Research David Orlinsky, lectured in 1996 and 1998 on the topic of "The professional and personal development of psychotherapists". As early as 1991, in collaboration with the Collaborative Research Network (CRN), David Orlinsky, and  Research on the development, further training and activity of psychotherapists was carried out with participants of the 41st Lindau Psychotherapy Weeks. In 1998 Theodor Seifert left the management team, but continued to be available to the Lindau Psychotherapy Weeks as an advisor to the management and as a member of the scientific advisory board. Peter Buchheim and Manfred Cierpka now directed the conference as a pair. From 2001  was part of the Scientific Board, from which Peter Buchheim resigned in 2003. In 2011 Peter Henningsen joined the Scientific Board.

Since 2009, the Vereinigung für psychotherapeutische Fort- und Weiterbildung e. V. (Association for Psychotherapeutic Continuing Education) has been holding Since 2009, the Vereinigung für psychotherapeutische Fort- und Weiterbildung e.V. has been organising support programmes for young psychotherapists with the aim of imparting competences on topics such as No fear of groups or Dealing with relatives in psychotherapy to newcomers to the profession who work in clinics or also in outpatient settings.

On the occasion of the 60th Lindau Psychotherapy Weeks in 2010, the Vereinigung für psychotherapeutische Fort- und Weiterbildung e.V. decided to publish an account of the history of the conference. Philipp Mettauer took on this task as a historian to trace the history of the conference. This account shows, analogous to the historical processes and the political developments in the Federal Republic, that the often exclusive focus on the upcoming reconstruction provided the alibi for avoiding a critical examination of the past of the Third Reich. This also characterised the conference for a long time. The necessary discussion has now been made up for.

In 2017, Dorothea Huber joined the Scientific Directorate as a new member. Manfred Cierpka, who had been part of the Scientific Direction since 1990, died in December 2017 In May 2018, Theodor Seifert also died. Verena Kast, member of the Scientific Directorate of the Lindau Psychotherapy Weeks since 2001, left the Scientific Directorate at the end of April 2020. From 2020, the psychologist Cord Benecke, who was previously a member of the Scientific Advisory Board of the Lindau Psychotherapy Weeks for many years, will be the new member of the management.

Quality assurance 
Quality assurance of the Lindau Psychotherapy Weeks has been taking place since 1993. Initially in evaluation studies and then in an annual evaluation, the acceptance and satisfaction of each event and of the entire conference are checked and reported back to the lecturers.

References

Further reading 
 Ernst Speer (ed.): Sammelband Lindauer Psychotherapiewochen 1950. Hippokrates-Verlag, Stuttgart 1951
 Ernst Speer (ed.): Sammelband Die Vorträge der 2. Lindauer Psychotherapiewoche 1951. Georg-Thieme-Verlag, Stuttgart 1952
 Ernst Speer (ed.): Sammelband Die Vorträge der 3. Lindauer Psychotherapiewoche 1952. Georg-Thieme-Verlag, Stuttgart 1953
 Ernst Speer (ed.): Sammelband Die Vorträge der 4. Lindauer Psychotherapiewoche 1953. Georg-Thieme-Verlag, Stuttgart 1954
 Ernst Speer (ed.): Sammelband Die Vorträge der 5. Lindauer Psychotherapiewoche 1954. Georg-Thieme-Verlag, Stuttgart 1955
 Ernst Speer (ed.): Sammelband Die Vorträge der 6. Lindauer Psychotherapiewoche 1954. Georg-Thieme-Verlag, Stuttgart 1956
 Ernst Speer (ed.): Sammelband Aktuelle Psychotherapie. J.F. Lehmanns Verlag, Munich 1958
 Ernst Speer (ed.): Sammelband Kritische Psychotherapie. J.F. Lehmanns Verlag, Munich 1959

 In 1956, Ernst Speer and Gustav Richard Heyer founded a quarterly journal for active-clinical psychotherapy under the name 'Psychotherapy' in the Hogrefe Publishing Group, Bern-Stuttgart. Helmuth Stolze and Otto Spatz renamed the bimonthly journal Praxis der Psychotherapie. The journal became the Organ of the Lindauer Psychotherapiewochen and the Lindauer Psychotherapiewochen guaranteed the journal a growing readership – editorship (1961–1970: Stolze and Wiesenhütter, 1971–1976: Dettmering and Hahn, who were joined by Rechenberger from 1977). In the 20 volumes that followed, the lectures of the Lindau Psychotherapy Weeks were published as completely as possible in the interest of psychotherapeutic training and further education, even if occasionally only in abridged versions.
 Helmuth Stolze: Die Lindauer Psychotherapiewoche. Ein Bericht zum 20-jährigen Bestehen. J.F. Lehmanns Verlag, Munich 1970; Online.
 In 1977 the journal was taken over by Springer-Verlag, Heidelberg, and in 1979 one of the directors of the Lindauer Psychotherapiewochen, Theodor Seifert, joined the editorial board. 40 years of Lindauer Psychotherapiewochen and 35 years of the journal Praxis der Psychotherapie und Psychosomatik represent periods of two developments that are very closely intertwined.
 Michael Ermann, Theodor Seifert (ed.): Die Familie in der Psychotherapie. Theoretische und praktische Aspekte aus tiefenpsychologischer und systemtheoretischer Sicht. Springer-Verlag, 1985
 Peter Buchheim, Peter Hahn, Theodor Seifert (ed.): Psychoanalyse und Psychotherapie in Vergangenheit und Gegenwart. In Erinnerung an den 100. Geburtstag von Viktor von Weizsäcker im Jahre 1986. Springer-Verlag 1987.
 Peter Buchheim, Theodor Seifert (ed.): Zur Psychodynamik und Psychotherapie von Aggression und Destruktion. Springer-Verlag, 1990
 The lectures of the 40th Lindau Psychotherapy Weeks on the leading themes "Psychotherapy in Change" and "Dependency" were published for the first time in 1991 in the book series "Lindauer Texte" published by Springer-Verlag and given to the participants of the Lindau Psychotherapy Weeks to deepen their psychotherapeutic further education and training. Until 2000 the "Lindauer Texte" were published annually.Lindauer Texte 1991–2000 in online-archiv of the Lindauer Psychotherapiewochen
 Since 1997, the Lindau Psychotherapy Modules have been published by Thieme Medical Publishers on disorder-oriented psychotherapy.
 Since 2005, the book series "Lindauer Beiträge zur Psychotherapie und Psychosomatik" has been published at Kohlhammer Verlag by Michael Ermann, since 2018 with Dorothea Huber. The volumes are based on lectures and seminars given by the authors at the Lindau Psychotherapy Weeks.
 The journal Praxis der Psychotherapie und Psychosomatik is continued by Springer-Verlag as Psychotherapeut 2016 in its 61st volume.
 Philipp Mettauer: Vergessen und Erinnern. Die Lindauer Psychotherapiewochen aus historischer Perspektive. Vereinigung für psychotherapeutische Fort- und Weiterbildung e.V., Munich 2010; Online.

External links 
 
 Lindauer Psychotherapiewochen Audio and Video

Academic conferences
Psychodynamic psychotherapy